The 1913–14 Prima Categoria season was won by Casale.

Regulation 
The Northern championship, which was the main tournament, was split in three groups of ten clubs, with eighteen matchdays, even if the Oriental group could not be filled.

The best two clubs of each group went to the final group. Last clubs should be relegated.

The experimental Southern groups had their own special regulations.

Teams 
US Alessandria for Piedmont, Liguria for Ligury, Nazionale Lombardia for Lombardy, and Petrarca Padua had been promoted according to the national regulation. However, Lombard local committee also promoted Juve Italia and AC Milanese Lambro, while Venetian local committee also promoted Udinese.

Following Baraldi-Baruffini agreement, three relegated clubs were re-elected, while Vigor Turin and Savona Calcio were also promoted. Finally, Como and Brescia FC were also invited to join.

Main tournament

Piedmont-Liguria

Classification

Results table

Lombardy

Classification

Results table

Veneto-Emilia

Classification

Results table

Final round

Classification

Results table

Central-Southern Italy tournament

Tuscany 

SPES Livorno advanced to Central Final.

Lazio 

Lazio advanced to Central Final.

Campania (Southern Final)

First Leg

Second Leg 

Internazionale Napoli won 3–2 on aggregate, advanced to Central-Southern Final.

Central Final

First Leg

Second Leg 

Lazio won 4–0 on aggregate, advanced to Central-Southern Final.

Central-Southern Final

First Leg

Second Leg 

Lazio won 9–0 on aggregate, advanced to the National Final.

National Finals
Played on 5 and 12 July 1914.

References and sources

1913-14
Italy